Don't Look Back – The Very Best of The Korgis is a two disc compilation album by English pop band The Korgis. It was released by Sanctuary Records/Castle Communications in the UK in 2003.

Don't Look Back compiles all three of the group's albums The Korgis, Dumb Waiters, and Sticky George in chronological order, including a few alternate versions, single edits as well as the rare 1982 non-album single "Don't Look Back", produced by Trevor Horn.
The compilation has extensive liner notes based on an interview with James Warren and was produced in collaboration with the band.

Track listing

Disc one
"Young 'n' Russian"  (Davis, Ridlington, Warren) – 3:12
"If I Had You" (Davis, Rachmaninoff) - 3:55
 Album version
"I Just Can't Help It" (Davis) - 3:43 
"Chinese Girl" (Davis) - 2:19 
"Art School Annexe" (Davis) - 3:37 
"Boots and Shoes" (Davis, Warren) - 4:32
"Dirty Postcards"  (Warren) - 4:45 
"O Maxine" (Warren) - 2:39 
"Mount Everest Sings the Blues" (Warren) - 2:32 
"Cold Tea" (Warren) - 3:50
 Edited version. 
 Tracks 1-10 from 1979 album The Korgis
"Silent Running" (Warren) - 3:05 
"Love Ain't Too Far Away" (Davis) - 3:29 
"Perfect Hostess" (Davis) - 3:21 
"Drawn and Quartered" (Warren) - 3:20 
"Everybody's Got to Learn Sometime" (Warren) - 4:15
 Original version. 
"Intimate" (Davis) - 3:08 
"It's No Good Unless You Love Me" (Warren) - 3:24
 Tracks 11-17 from 1980 album Dumb Waiters

Disc two
"If It's Alright With You Baby" (Warren) - 3:45
 Single edit.  
"Dumb Waiters" (Warren) - 2:42 
"Rover's Return" (Davis) - 3:34
"Everybody's Got to Learn Sometime" (Warren) - 4:22
 Alternate version.
 Tracks 1-4 from 1980 album Dumb Waiters
"That Was My Big Mistake" (Davis, Warren) - 4:17
 Edited version.
"All the Love in the World" (Davis, Warren) - 3:40
 Single edit. 
"Sticky George" (Harrison, Warren) - 3:36 
"Can't We Be Friends Now" (Warren) - 4:01 
"Foolishness of Love" (Harrison) - 3:31 
"Domestic Bliss" (Gordon, Harrison, Warren) - 3:15 
"Nowhere to Run" (Davis, Warren) - 5:17
 Alternate version.
"Contraband" (Warren) - 3:18 
"Don't Say That It's Over" (Warren) - 2:50 
"Living on the Rocks" (Warren) - 3:32
 Tracks 5-14 from 1981 album Sticky George
"Don't Look Back" (Warren) - 4:12
"Xenophobia" (Warren) - 2:27
 Tracks 15 & 16 from 1982 7" single "Don't Look Back"
"Everybody's Gotta Learn Sometime" - 3:51
 DNA '93 Housey 7" remix

Personnel
 James Warren - vocals, bass guitar, electric guitar, keyboards
 Andy Davis - vocals, drums, keyboards, mandolin, electric guitar
 Phil Harrison - keyboards, percussion, synthesizer, electric piano, drums, spoons
 Stuart Gordon - violin, mandolin, percussion, acoustic guitar, banjo, percussion, background vocals
 Glenn Tommey - keyboards
 David Lord - keyboards
 Bill Birks - drums, percussion
 Al Powell - drums
 Manny Elias - drums
 Jerry Marotta - drums
 Kenny Lacey - percussion
 David Lord - percussion, keyboards
 Stephen Paine - programming
 Keith Warmington - harmonica
 Steve Buck - flute
 Dave Pegler - clarinet
 Chantelle Samuel - bassoon
 Stephanie Nunn - oboe
 Huw Pegler - horn
 Jo Mullet - backing vocals
 Jo Pomeroy - backing vocals
 Ali Cohn - backing vocals
 The Korgettes (Sheena Power & Jo Mullet) - backing vocals

Production
 The Korgis - producers
 David Lord - sound engineer, producer, wind and strings arranger
 Glenn Tommey - assistant engineer
 Trevor Horn - producer track 15, disc 2
 Paul Bevoir - compilation, design
 Jon Smith - compilation coordination
 Steve Hammonds - compilation coordination
 Masterpiece – audio remastering

Release history
 2003 Music Sanctuary/Castle Music CMDDD 673

References

The Korgis albums
2003 compilation albums